"Soul Pride" is an instrumental written by James Brown and Alfred Ellis and recorded by James Brown with his band. Released as a two-part single in 1969, it charted #33 R&B.

References

James Brown songs
Songs written by James Brown
1969 singles
1960s instrumentals
Songs written by Alfred "Pee Wee" Ellis
1969 songs
King Records (United States) singles